Giuseppe Zamponi also Gioseffo Zamponi (or Zamboni, Samponi, c.1615 – February 1662) was an Italian composer best remembered for his opera Ulisse all'isola di Circe performed in Brussels in 1650, which was the first opera performed in the low countries, at the time part of the Spanish ruled Southern Netherlands.

Zamponi was born in Rome, and was the organist at Nostra Signora del Sacro Cuore, then known as San Giacomo degli Spagnoli, in Rome's Piazza Navona, from 1629 to 1638, substituting for Paolo Tarditi (c.1580-1661). From 1638 to 1647 he was in the service of cardinal Pietro Maria Borghese (1599-1642). In 1648 he left Italy to join the court in Brussels of Archduke Leopold Wilhelm of Austria, who was governor of the Southern Netherlands on behalf of the King of Spain. He was appointed maestro di cappella in 1648, and died  in 1662Brussels.

Ulisse all'isola di Circe was performed on 24 February 1650 in celebration of the October 1649 wedding of Philip IV of Spain and Mariana of Austria. It was staged again in 1655 at the occasion of the visit of Queen Christina from Sweden.

Works, editions and recordings
 Dies irae per 5 voci e 3 strumenti
 Sonata per violino, viola da gamba e basso continuo
 Sonata per violino, viola e basso continuo
 Sonata per 2 violini e basso continuo
 Capriccio
 2 arie
 Opera Ulisse all'isola di Circe. - Recording Leonardo García Alarcón 2012

References

Italian male classical composers
1662 deaths
1610s births
Italian opera composers
Male opera composers
Musicians from Rome
Italian organists
Male organists
17th-century Italian composers
17th-century male musicians